Massoud Abdelhafid is a Libyan retired army general during the government of Muammar Gaddafi. He held various positions in government following the 1969 coup d'etat of Muammar Gaddafi, including Commander of Military Security, Governor of Southern Libya and Head of Security in Major Cities. He was a key figure in Libya's relations with neighbouring Chad and Sudan. Massoud Abdelhafid was a senior commander in the Libyan Army during the Chadian–Libyan conflict. Known for his leadership of Libyan-backed insurrections and wars in Chad, he was referred to as "Mr Chad".

2011 Libyan civil war
The United Nations Security Council drafted a resolution naming 23 senior Libyan officials in the regime of Muammar Gaddafi to be sanctioned. The resolution, which included travel bans and asset freezes, named Massoud Abdelhafid.

Following the defection of Abdul Fatah Younis, Gaddafi designated Abdelhafid as interior minister. General Massoud Abdelhafid led the pro-Gaddafi forces in the city of Sabha during the Battle of Sabha and the Fezzan campaign.

Abdelhafid was reported to have fled to Egypt alongside Interior Minister Nassr al-Mabrouk Abdullah.

Notes

Libyan Arab Socialist Union politicians
Libyan generals
Living people
People of the First Libyan Civil War
Year of birth missing (living people)